FK Hajduk Beograd is a football club based in Lion, Belgrade, Serbia. They compete in the Belgrade Zone League, the fourth tier of the national league system.

History
After triumphing in the 1992–93 Belgrade Zone League, the club subsequently won the Serbian League North in the 1993–94 season and took promotion to the Second League of FR Yugoslavia. They placed second in the NATO bombing-shortened 1998–99 season and gained promotion to the First League of FR Yugoslavia. However, the club was immediately relegated back to the second tier, finishing 18th out of 21 in its debut season in the top flight.

In the 2003–04 season, the club won the Second League of Serbia and Montenegro (Group East) and took promotion to the 2004–05 First League of Serbia and Montenegro. They eventually finished bottom of the table, but were administratively relegated to the third tier. In the 2006–07 season, the club won the Serbian League Belgrade and got promoted to the Serbian First League. They spent the next two seasons in the second tier, before suffering relegation back to the third tier of Serbian football. In the 2008–09 Serbian Cup, the club surprisingly reached the quarter-finals, being eliminated by Partizan.

Honours
Second League of Serbia and Montenegro (Tier 2)
 2003–04 (Group East)
Serbian League North / Serbian League Belgrade (Tier 3)
 1993–94 / 2006–07
Belgrade Zone League (Tier 4)
 1992–93

Seasons

Rivalries
The club has a long-standing rivalry with nearby neighbours Zvezdara. Matches between the two sides are known as the Zvezdara derby.

Notable players
This is a list of players who have played at full international level.
  Perica Stančeski
  Andrija Kaluđerović
  Vladimir Dišljenković
  Saša Kovačević
  Zoran Ranković
  Miroslav Savić
For a list of all FK Hajduk Beograd players with a Wikipedia article, see :Category:FK Hajduk Beograd players.

Managerial history

References

External links
 Club page at Srbijasport

1937 establishments in Serbia
Association football clubs established in 1937
Football clubs in Belgrade
Football clubs in Serbia
Zvezdara